Stonor is a village in Oxfordshire, England.

Stonor may also refer to:

 Stonor Park, and Stonor House
 Stonor, Tasmania, a locality in Australia
The Stonor Eagles, a 1982 novel by William Horwood

People
 Edmund Stonor (1831–1912), British Catholic archbishop
 John Stonor (judge) (1281–1354), British justice
 Julia Camoys Stonor (b. 1939), British author
 Oliver Stonor (1903–1987), English novelist, reviewer, translator, and man of letters. 
 Stonor, the family name of Baron Camoys

See also
 Stoner (disambiguation)